Quesnel Lake Airport  is located adjacent to Quesnel Lake, British Columbia, Canada.

See also
Quesnel Airport

References

Registered aerodromes in British Columbia
Cariboo Regional District